Nederweerterdijk is a hamlet in the Dutch province of Limburg. It is located in the municipality of Peel en Maas, about 3 km west of the center of that village.

Nederweerterdijk has no place sign names and consists of about 25 houses.

References

Populated places in Limburg (Netherlands)
Peel en Maas